Thomas Cahill (14 June 1931 – 27 January 2003) was a Scottish professional footballer who played as a left back.

Career
Born in Glasgow, Cahill played for Vale of Leven, Newcastle United and Barrow.

References

1931 births
2003 deaths
Scottish footballers
Vale of Leven F.C. players
Newcastle United F.C. players
Barrow A.F.C. players
English Football League players
Association football fullbacks
Footballers from Glasgow